Bobsleigh is an event in the Winter Olympic Games where a two- or four-person team drives a specially designed sled down an ice track, with the winning team completing the route with the fastest time.  The event has been featured since the first Winter Games in 1924 in Chamonix, France, with the exception of the 1960 games in Squaw Valley when the organizing committee decided not to build a track in order to reduce expenses.  Other than that exception, the four-man competition has been competed at every game (in 1928, it was a five-man competition).  The two-man event was introduced at the 1932 Lake Placid games and a two-woman event was first contested at the 2002 Salt Lake City Olympics.

Events

Medal leaders

Athletes who have won multiple medals (including at least one gold) are listed below.

Men

Women

Elana Meyers Taylor has more Olympic bobsleigh medals than any other woman, but lacks a gold; her five medals comprise three silver and two bronze from 2010 through 2022.

Medal table 

Sources (after the 2022 Winter Olympics):
Accurate as of 2022 Winter Olympics.

Notes
2 gold medals and no silver were awarded at 1998 two-man event
2 bronze medals awarded at 1998 four-man event
2 gold medals and no silver were awarded at 2018 two-man event
2 silver medals and no bronze were awarded at 2018 four-man event

Number of bobsledders by nation

See also
 List of Olympic venues in bobsleigh

References

External links

 
Olympics
Sports at the Winter Olympics